SI-UK is a UK-based international education consultant organisation, which works with universities and higher education institutions and helps students with the application and selection process at UK universities. As of 2022, the company has 80 offices in 40 countries across the globe.

History 
SI-UK was founded in 2006 by Dwayne Gallagher, Orion Judge and Vicki Fox. It opened its first overseas office in London in 2008 followed by offices in Delhi and Bangkok.

In 2021, the company expanded its presence with offices in Uzbekistan, Kazakhstan, Indonesia, Morocco, Poland and Spain. 

In March 2021, the company partnered with Quacquarelli Symonds (QS), a British company founded in 1990, to provide a counselling service to international students.

In May 2022, the company held a study fair in St. Regent’s Hotel, Mumbai, where representative from universities like the University of Leeds, University of Warwick, Cardiff University, School of Oriental and African Studies, Keele, King's College London, and Oxford Brookes University were present.

The company sold a partial stake to Averna Capital with Dwayne Gallagher and Orion Judge retaining a significant stake and continuing to lead the company.

In July 2022, the company appointed Lakshmi Iyer as the managing director of its India operations.

Awards 

 2021: PIEoneer Award

References 

Recruit (company)
British companies established in 2006